The 2022 GrønlandsBANKEN GM is the 52nd edition of the Greenlandic Football Championship. The final round was held in Ilulissat from August 8 to 13. It was won by Nagdlunguaq-48 for the twelfth time in its history.

Qualifying stage

Avannaata
All matches in Uummannaq.

Qeqertalik
All matches in Qeqertarsuaq

Qeqqata
All matches in Maniitsoq

Sermersooq
All matches in Nuuk

Kujalleq
Apparently, only Kissaviarsuk-33 registered, thus qualifying automatically.

Final round
All matches in Ilulissat

Qualified teams

Group 1

Group 2

Playoffs

Semi-finals

Semi-finals

Third-place match

Final

Placement playoff matches

Semi-finals

Seventh-place match

Fifth-place match

Top goalscorers

Tournament ranking

See also
Football in Greenland
Football Association of Greenland
Greenland national football team
Greenlandic Men's Football Championship

References

Foot